Sylvain Armand (born 1 August 1980) is a French former professional footballer who played as a left-back for Rennes, Paris Saint-Germain, Nantes, and Clermont.

Career
Born in Saint-Étienne, Loire, Armand started playing youth team football for AS Saint-Étienne in 1994. He wasn't retained for the club's senior squad and thus moved to Clermont Foot in 1999, where he received his professional debut.

Nantes
In 2000, having impressed with his performances in Clermont, he switched to top-flight club FC Nantes. He staged his first appearance in Division 1 during the match between AJ Auxerre in Nantes (2–2) 9 September 2000. In a fairytale ending, he won the 2001 Division1 1 championship in his very first season with the "Canaris". He also scored as Nantes won the 2001 Trophée des Champions. The following three seasons were much less successful. He is also the author of a memorable goal in the UEFA Champions League against Lazio in 2001–02, following a lonely run on the left flank.

Paris Saint-Germain

In 2004, Armand and Nantes teammate Mario Yepes both moved to Paris Saint-Germain for approximately $5 million. After a very difficult season for PSG, Armand took part in the victory of PSG in the Coupe de France in the April 2006 final against Olympique de Marseille. He was then voted best player in the Paris squad for the 2006–07 season following an impressive season, including a very important goal against RC Lens. At the start of the 2006–07 season, Armand signed a two-year extension with the club, keeping him at the club until 2010.

In 2007–08, Armand lost his starting spot status for a game against Valenciennes FC in favour of youngster Mamadou Sakho, who also became the youngest captain in the history of the PSG at the age of 17. Armand then gradually regained his best form, game after game. He provided two consecutive assists, both to Amara Diané, against Lens in Ligue 1 (3–0) then against Valenciennes in the Coupe de la Ligue (4–0) three days later. Rarely injured and suspended, he missed only eight domestic league games between 2004 and 2008, all the while playing in different positions on the pitch, including left-back, centre-back, defensive midfield, and left midfield.

With PSG, Armand won the 2006 and 2010 Coupe de France and the 2008 Coupe de la Ligue. The club's league performances were much less satisfactory, with a series of mid-and low-table finishes between 2004 and 2008. Even in the club's worst seasons, between 2006 and 2008, Armand established himself as a reliable performer and remained loyal to Paris Saint-Germain in spite of interest from other French clubs. During this barren spell, he formed an efficient partnership on the left flank with Jérôme Rothen, and they were a major revelation in an otherwise disappointing Parisian side. In July 2009, Armand signed a three-year contract, keeping him at the club until 2012.

After the arrival of new coach Antoine Kombouaré in 2009, Armand was deployed in positions other than left-back, playing in central defence and even as a defensive midfielder when needed. On 17 April 2011, he reached a new landmark when he participated in his 319th game for PSG, thus overtaking legendary goalkeeper Bernard Lama's record. In September 2011, Armand signed a one-year extension with the club, lasting until 2013.

After Carlo Ancelotti replaced the sacked Antoine Kombouaré, Armand struggled to remain a regular starter, especially after the influx of new players brought in by the club's wealthy new Qatari owners, led by Nasser Al-Khelaifi.
Although he thought about leaving the team at the end of the season, he chose to remain with PSG for the 2012–13 season in the hope of finally winning the French championship. Armand made his 400th appearance for the club in Le Classique against Marseille, as PSG won 2–0.

On 12 May 2013, two games before the end of the season, PSG secured their third Ligue 1 champions title, 19 years after their last championship win and nine years after Armand's arrival in the club. Armand then quoted:

In the last game of the season, against FC Lorient, Armand was given the captaincy armband in his last PSG appearance as part of a farewell gesture. At the time of his departure, Armand was the club's longest-serving player and he has been given the nickname "Mr. PSG."

Rennes
On 3 June 2013, Armand joined Rennes on a free transfer, signing a contract with the club lasting until 2015. Armand was previously linked with a move back to FC Nantes. On 1 July, Armand was officially presented by the club.

On 14 January 2017, Armand announced he would end his career at the end of the season.

Post-playing career
In July 2017, following his retirement as a player, Armand was appointed deputy of Rennes' director of recruitment Jean-Luc Buisine.

Career statistics

Club

Honours
Nantes
 Division 1: 2000–01
 Trophée des Champions: 2001

Paris Saint-Germain
 Ligue 1: 2012–13
 Coupe de France: 2005–06, 2009–10
 Coupe de la Ligue: 2007–08

References

External links

 Sylvain-Armand.com
 PSG profile

1980 births
Living people
Footballers from Saint-Étienne
French footballers
Association football defenders
Clermont Foot players
FC Nantes players
Paris Saint-Germain F.C. players
Stade Rennais F.C. players
Ligue 1 players